Patricia Ann Jellicoe   (15 July 1927 – 31 August 2017) was an English playwright, theatre director and actress. Although her work covered many areas of theatre and film, she is best known for "pushing the envelope" of the stage play, devising new forms which challenge and delight unconventional audiences.  As a result, her dramatic career is, in many ways, unique in the twentieth century.

Biography
Jellicoe was born in Middlesbrough, Yorkshire in England in 1927 and from childhood showed an interest and an aptitude for the theatre. She attended Polam Hall School and Queen Margaret's School, York and studied performing arts at the Central School of Speech and Drama. This was followed by experience in repertory and fringe theatre.

In 1949, she was commissioned to undertake an investigative study into the relationship between acting and theatre architecture; the finding of this study led her to the Open stage. Jellicoe established a Sunday Theatre Club (Cockpit Theatre Club) where she produced and directed a number of plays exploring the possibilities of this form of Open stage theatre, including a one-act of her own.

Thereafter, Jellicoe used many of her plays to further explore her innovative ideas on theatre. In 1956, The Observer established a playwright's competition to find new talent. Jellicoe submitted  The Sport of My Mad Mother, which won a prize in the competition. In writing this play Jellicoe applied many of the ideas she had learnt in her early years at Central School. The play was subsequently staged by the Royal Court Theatre and directed by George Devine and Jellicoe. Although originally a commercial failure, the play was later performed internationally in many languages.  Set in a Cockney neighbourhood of London, it combines realism, mysticism, music, dance, and ritual to create a powerful, feminist myth about modern civilisation. Jellicoe revised the original 1958 version in 1962 to create a better play.

The play's title derives from a Hindu religious saying: "All creation is the sport of my mad mother Kali" (a Hindu goddess). However, as most Londoners know, "the sport of me mad mother" is also a Cockney expression implying something highly unusual.

Jellicoe's best known play is The Knack first performed at the Royal Court in 1962. A major hit, the play was later adapted into a film version which won the Palme d'Or at Cannes. Directed by Richard Lester; the film's cast included Michael Crawford and Rita Tushingham. In it a group of young, London adults clash and commiserate about how to get "the knack" with the opposite sex. Jellicoe has also written plays for children.

One of Jellicoe's most interesting works is a brief essay entitled, "Some Unconscious Influences in the Theatre."  In a space of about thirty pages, she devises a number of complex yet common-sense theories which account for the reasons why audiences react to stage and screen as they do.

The Colway Theatre Trust
In 1978, Jellicoe set up the Colway Theatre Trust to explore the concept of Community Plays: pioneering work which she continued to develop over the next ten years. Jon Oram became artistic director of Colway Theatre in 1985 – now called Claque Theatre.

Colway Theatre Trust are the founders of the Community Play genre. A community play as practised by Colway is the result of no less than 18 months work. They are original plays written for and about a specific community. The writer generally works with a community research team. Plays are traditionally performed in a promenade style where the audience and cast share the same space with action happening on stages around the edge of that space and in the body of the standing audience. In 2000, Colway Theatre relocated to Kent in South East England and changed its name to Claque. The company is of international standing, run by Jon Oram who has written, produced or directed over 40 productions.

In 1962, Jellicoe married the photographer Roger Mayne. They moved to Lyme Regis in Dorset in 1975, and lived at Colway Manor (hence the name of the Colway Theatre Trust). After Mayne died in 2014, Jellicoe moved to West Bay in Dorset. Jellicoe herself died at the end of August 2017.

Selected works
Following list from Who's Who 
 The Knack:  A Comedy in Three Acts. London: Encore, 1962; New York: French, 1962.
 The Sport of My Mad Mother. Revised version. London: Faber, 1964; New York: Dell, 1964. Originally published in The Observer Plays, London: Faber & Faber, 1958.
 Shelley; or, The Idealist. London: Faber & Faber, 1966; New York: Grove Press, 1966.
 Some Unconscious Influences in the Theatre. Cambridge: Cambridge University Press, 1967. Judith Wilson Lecture, 1967.
 The Giveaway: A Comedy. London: Faber & Faber, 1970.
 The Seagull by Anton Chekhov, translated by Jellicoe & Adriadne Nicolaeff. New York: Avon, 1975.
 Three Jelliplays. London: Faber & Faber, 1975. Contains You'll Never Guess; Clever Elsie, Smiling John, Silent Peter, and A Good Thing or a Bad Thing.
 Devon, by Jellicoe and Roger Mayne. London: Faber & Faber, 1975. A Shell Guide.
 Community Plays: How to Put Them On. London: Methuer, 1987.

Community Plays: Writer, Director & Producer:
 The Reckoning, Lyme Regis, 1978
 The Tide, Axe Valley, 1980
 Mark og Mont, (Money & Land) Holbaek, Denmark 1989
 Under the God, Dorchester, 1989
 Changing Places, Woking, 1992

Community plays by other writers: director and/or producer including: Howard Barker, David Edgar, Charles Wood, John Downie, Sheila Yeger, Andrew Dickson, Arnold Wesker, David Cregan, Nick Darke, Peter Terson and Jon Oram

National Life Stories conducted an oral history interview (C1316/04) with Ann Jellicoe in 2008 for its The Legacy of the English Stage Company held by the British Library.

Notes

References
 
 
  – Subscription required.

External links
 Claque Theatre (formerly the Colway Trust).
 Ann Jellicoe at Doollee
 Ann Jellicoe at the British Film Institute
 

1927 births
2017 deaths
Alumni of the Royal Central School of Speech and Drama
English dramatists and playwrights
English theatre directors
Officers of the Order of the British Empire
People educated at Queen Margaret's School, York
People from Middlesbrough